Sweden held a general election on the 18 September 1960. 232 seats were filled in the election.

Results

Regional results

Percentage share

By votes

Constituency results

Percentage share

By votes

References

General elections in Sweden